The 1952–53 Scottish Cup was the 68th staging of Scotland's most prestigious football knockout competition. The Cup was won by Rangers who defeated Aberdeen in the replayed final.

First round

Replays

Second round

Replays

Third round

Replays

Quarter-finals

Replays

Semi-finals

Replays

Final

Replay

See also
1952–53 in Scottish football
1952–53 Scottish League Cup

Scottish Cup seasons
1952–53 in Scottish football
Scot